Edward Dixon (1884 – after 1907) was an English footballer who scored three goals from 38 appearances in the Football League playing for Lincoln City and Hull City. He played as a right back or at centre forward. He was on the books of Sunderland before joining Lincoln, but played no competitive first-team football.

References

1884 births
Year of death missing
Sportspeople from Easington, County Durham
Footballers from County Durham
English footballers
Association football fullbacks
Association football forwards
Sunderland A.F.C. players
Lincoln City F.C. players
Hull City A.F.C. players
English Football League players
Place of death missing